Hoshimiya Shrine is a Shinto shrine in the city of Sano, in Tochigi Prefecture, Japan.

Shinto shrines in Tochigi Prefecture